The golden-backed weaver (Ploceus jacksoni), also known as Jackson's weaver, is a species of bird in the family Ploceidae.

It is found in Burundi, Kenya, South Sudan, Tanzania, and Uganda.

References

External links
 Golden-backed weaver -  Species text in Weaver Watch.
 Videos, photos, and sounds - Internet Bird Collection

golden-backed weaver
Birds of East Africa
golden-backed weaver
Taxonomy articles created by Polbot